Both Sides Now is a studio album released by English singer Michael Ball. It was released on 25 February 2013 in the United Kingdom by Union Square Music. The album peaked at number 8 on the UK Albums Chart.

Singles
"The Perfect Song" was released as the lead single from the album on 15 March 2013. "Fight the Fight" was released as the second single from the album on 3 June 2013.

Track listing
All songs produced by Nick Patrick and Steve Mac.

Charts

Certifications

Release history

References

2013 albums
Michael Ball albums